Aleksandra Andreevna Ermakova (born November 24, 1992) is a retired individual rhythmic gymnast representing Russia.

Career

Junior 
2006
At the early age of 14, Aleksandra Ermakova stunned the rhythmic gymnastics world with her appearance at the 2006 Junior European Championships in Moscow, Russia. Competing only in rope, she won her first major international gold medal.
2007
Ermakova won the junior all-round competition at the Aeon Cup 2007 in Tokyo, Japan.
August 2007 brought gold to Ermakova in both the junior all-round competition and in all four junior finals (rope, hoop, ball & ribbon) at the Ljubljana World Cup in Slovenia.
In April 2007 Aleksandra Ermakova won the junior all-round competition at the World Cup in Portimao (Portugal), after finishing first with three of her four exercises (rope, ball, ribbon). 
Ermakova won the junior all-round competition at the Coupe d'Opale 2007 in Calais, France.

Senior 
Ermakova finished 10th in the senior all-round World Cup competition in Corbeil-Essonnes, France.
The invitational meeting Baltic Hoop 2008, in Riga (Latvia) brought gold medals to Aleksandra Ermakova in all four apparatus. Ermakova continued to struggle transitioning into seniors in her competitions and faced back and knee injuries. She completed her career in 2010.

References

External links

Aleksandra Ermakova rope EC Moscow  06 - youtube video

1992 births
Living people
Russian rhythmic gymnasts
Gymnasts from Moscow
21st-century Russian women